Hamze is a surname. Notable people with the surname include:

Darine Hamze (born 1978), Lebanese actress, director, and producer
Hassan Hamze, Lebanese fencer
Jouana Hamze (born 1988), Lebanese footballer 
Kassem Hamzé (born 1950), Lebanese sprinter
Mona Abou Hamze (born 1968), Lebanese television personality and presenter